Minnesota State Highway 222 (MN 222) is a short  highway in northwest Minnesota, which runs from its intersection with State Highway 92 in Lambert Township of Red Lake County and continues north to its northern terminus at its intersection with Red Lake County State-Aid Highway 5 in Oklee.

Route description
Highway 222 serves as a short north–south connector route in northwest Minnesota. It connects State Highway 92 with the town of Oklee.

The route is legally defined as Route 222 in the Minnesota Statutes.

History
Highway 222 was authorized on July 1, 1949.

The route was paved at the time it was marked.

The 2019 Minnesota Legislature authorized removal of the highway, pending a turnback agreement with Red Lake County.

Major intersections

References

External links

Highway 222 at the Unofficial Minnesota Highways Page

222
Transportation in Red Lake County, Minnesota